Westlake Station or West Lake station may refer to:

West Lake station (MARTA), a metro rail station in Atlanta, Georgia, United States
West Lake Street station, an under construction light rail and bus rapid transit station in Minneapolis, Minnesota, United States
Westlake station (Sound Transit), a light rail and bus station in Seattle, Washington, United States
Westlake/MacArthur Park station, a subway station in Los Angeles, California, United States

See also
 West Lake (disambiguation)